Scriptorium is the digital library of the Bibliothèque cantonale et universitaire (BCU), part of the University of Lausanne in the Swiss canton of Vaud. It was launched on 7 December 2012 and initially included more than a million pages of digitized newspapers published in Vaud canton. All of the content is freely available to the public on the Scriptorium website. In their annual report, BCU reported 2,973,638 visits to Scriptorium Digital Library for its first full year of availability (2013). By the end of 2013, the collection had grown to 2,153,176 pages.

Unlike a typical digital library, Scriptorium allows full-text search through its entire collection. Every word that is found is highlighted directly on scanned images.
 
Scriptorium includes the following digital collections:
24 Heures
Annonces et avis divers
Feuille d'Avis de Lausanne
Feuille périodique
Allez savoir!
UNI Lausanne
Uniscope
Almanach Balthasar
Almanach de Chalamala
Chut
Croquis vaudois
Gribouille et Redzipe
La Bombe
La Cancoire
La Crecelle
La Fronde
La Griffe
La Guêpe
La Lanterne de Petollion
La Marge
La Pomme
L'Arbalète
Le Bistouri
Le Bonjour de Jack Rollan
Le Canard libre
Le Charivari
Le Clairon du Nord
Le Frondeur
Le Grelot
Le Journal de Jack Rollan
Le Kangourou
Le Moniteur
Le Moustique
Le Passe-Temps
Le Père Jérôme
Le Semeur
Mépris
Propos vaudois
Domaine Public
Journal helvétique
Mercure suisse
Messager boiteux
Nouvelliste suisse
L'Estafette: Journal suisse
Le Matin - Lausanne
Presse Lausannoise
Tribune de Lausanne - Le Matin
Tribune de Lausanne et Estafette
La petite revue
La revue
La revue agricole
La revue de Lausanne
La revue du dimanche
Lausanne-Soir
Nouvelle revue
Nouvelle revue de Lausanne
Nouvelle revue de Lausanne et du Pays de Vaud
Nouvelle revue et journal politique
Nouvelle revue hebdo
L'ami de la vérité: journal du Canton de Vaud
Le nouvelliste vaudois
Nouvelliste vaudois: journal liberal démocratique
Nouvelliste vaudois et journal national suisse
Journal de Charles Constant

References

External links
 Scriptorium Digital Library

Swiss digital libraries
Online archives
Internet properties established in 2012